"The Enemy Within the Gates" is the fourth episode of the first series of the British comedy series Dad's Army. It was originally transmitted on Wednesday 28 August 1968, one week later than planned, due to the Warsaw Pact Invasion of Czechoslovakia.

Synopsis
A stranger with a suspicious foreign accent convinces Mainwairing's men that he is a Polish officer serving with GHQ who has come to inform them of a £10 reward for every Nazi arrested. While on night patrol, Jones' section capture two German airmen, but Private Godfrey complicates matters by allowing them to escape while they visit the lavatory.

Plot
Captain Winogrodzki of the Polish Forces informs the platoon that there will be a £10 reward for every live parachutist captured. Jones, Walker and Pike catch two, who escape and are caught by Winogrodzki, who announces his intention to claim the bounty for himself. But when the prisoners are collected by MPs to be taken to GHQ, Walker convinces the soldiers to take Winogrodzki too, on account of his accent. The platoon spend £5, of their £30 reward, on a celebration dinner.

Cast

Arthur Lowe as Captain Mainwaring
John Le Mesurier as Sergeant Wilson
Clive Dunn as Lance Corporal Jones
John Laurie as Private Frazer
James Beck as Private Walker
Arnold Ridley as Private Godfrey
Ian Lavender as Private Pike
Caroline Dowdeswell as Janet King
Carl Jaffe as Captain Winogrodzki
Denys Peeks as German pilot
Nigel Rideout as German pilot
Bill Pertwee as ARP Warden Hodges
David Davenport as Military Police Sergeant

Radio episode
In the radio version of the episode, only one German airman is captured and only £20 bounty is due after Walker persuades the MPs to additionally take Winogrodzki.

Notes
Nigel Rideout was given an extra £10 for writing the German dialogue in the script.
The episode was scheduled originally to be broadcast on 21 August 1968. However, the BBC cancelled that evening's schedule to cover the Warsaw Pact invasion of Czechoslovakia.

References

External links

Dad's Army (series 1) episodes
1968 British television episodes